Fred Perry defeated the defending champion Jack Crawford in the final, 6–3, 6–0, 7–5 to win the gentlemen's singles tennis title at the 1934 Wimbledon Championships.

Seeds

  Jack Crawford (final)
  Fred Perry (champion)
  Gottfried von Cramm (fourth round)
  Bunny Austin (quarterfinals)
  Frank Shields (semifinals)
  Lester Stoefen (quarterfinals)
  Sidney Wood (semifinals)
  Giorgio de Stefani (second round)

Draw

Finals

Top half

Section 1

Section 2

Section 3

Section 4

Bottom half

Section 5

Section 6

Section 7

Section 8

References

External links
 

Men's Singles
Wimbledon Championship by year – Men's singles